The State Botanical Garden of Georgia is a botanical garden of  in the United States, with a conservatory operated by the University of Georgia. It is located at 2450 South Milledge Avenue, Athens, Georgia.

The Garden contains eleven botanical and horticultural collections:

 Annual/Perennial Garden - annuals and perennials
 Dahlia Garden (1987) - dahlias
 Groundcover Collection - bugleflower, euonymus, hypericum, ivy, juniper, liriope, ophiopogon, thrift, vinca, etc.
 Heritage Garden - plants of historic and social interest to Georgia, including apples, pears, and peaches, cotton, peanuts, and tobacco.
 International Garden - Middle Ages (Herb Garden and Physic Garden), Age of Exploration (Mediterranean & Middle East, Spanish America, American South, and China sections), and Age of Conservation (American Indian Plants, Bog Garden, Threatened & Endangered Plants).
 Native Azalea Collection - azaleas
 Native Flora Garden - more than 300 species, including ferns, trilliums, bloodroot, and lady slipper orchids.
 Rhododendron Collection (1976) - rhododendrons
 Flower Garden - Brand new in 2008.
 Shade Garden - azalea, camellia, dogwood, laurel, magnolia, redbud, and viburnum.
 Trial Garden - shrubs and trees under evaluation for the southeastern United States.

In 1984, it received the designation as Georgia's "State Botanical Garden".

See also 
 University of Georgia Campus Arboretum
 List of botanical gardens in the United States
 Coastal Georgia Botanical Gardens

References 

Botanical Garden Breathes Life into Athens, Wayne C. Wehunt, Online Athens
The New Georgia Encyclopedia entry for the State Botanical Garden of Georgia

External links 
 State Botanical Garden of Georgia Website official Web site

University of Georgia campus
Botanical gardens in Georgia (U.S. state)
Protected areas of Clarke County, Georgia
Tourist attractions in Athens, Georgia
Symbols of Georgia (U.S. state)